Stephen Moore may refer to:

People

Politics
 Stephen Moore, 1st Viscount Mount Cashell (1696–1766), Anglo-Irish aristocrat and politician
Stephen Moore, 1st Earl Mount Cashell (1730–1790), Anglo-Irish aristocrat and politician, his son 
Stephen Moore, 2nd Earl Mount Cashell (1770–1822), Anglo-Irish aristocrat and politician, his grandson 
Stephen Moore, 3rd Earl Mount Cashell (1792–1883), Anglo-Irish aristocrat, and politician, his great-grandson 
Stephen Moore, 4th Earl Mount Cashell (1825–1889)
 Stephen Moore (MP) (1836–1897), Irish politician
 Stephen Moore (Canadian politician), candidate in the 2008 Canadian federal election

Sport
 Stephen Moore (athlete) (born 1975), American decathlete
 Stephen Moore (cricketer) (born 1980), English cricketer
 Stephen Moore (judoka) (born 1969), American Paralympic judoka
 Stephen Moore (rugby union) (born 1983), Australian rugby footballer

Other people
 Stephen Moore (actor) (1937–2019), English actor, voice of Marvin the Android
 Stephen Campbell Moore (born 1979), English actor
 Stephen Moore (writer) (born 1960), American economic writer
 Stephen Moore (fl. 1998), executive at One.Tel
 Stephen Moore, murdered in 2013 by his ex-wife Kathleen Dorsett

Fictional characters
Stephen Moore, character in 13Hrs

See also
Steve Moore (disambiguation)
Steven Moore (disambiguation)
Stevon Moore (born 1967), former American football player